Margival is a commune in the Aisne department in Hauts-de-France in northern France.

History
During World War II, the Führerhauptquartier Wolfsschlucht II, one of the  Adolf Hitler's Western Front military headquarters, was built there.

Population

See also
Communes of the Aisne department

References

Communes of Aisne
Aisne communes articles needing translation from French Wikipedia